Sergei Sergeyevich Chudin (born 24 November 1973) is a Russian professional football coach and a former player.

Club career
He made his debut in the Soviet Top League in 1991 for FC Spartak Moscow.

Honours
 Soviet Top League runner-up: 1991.
 Soviet Cup winner: 1992.
 Russian Premier League champion: 1992, 1993, 1994, 1996.
 Russian Premier League bronze: 1995.
 Russian Cup winner: 1994.
 Russian Cup finalist: 1996.

European club competitions
 UEFA Champions League 1994–95 with FC Spartak Moscow: 1 game.
 UEFA Champions League 1995–96 with FC Spartak Moscow: 1 game.
 UEFA Intertoto Cup 1997 with FC Lokomotiv Nizhny Novgorod: 4 games.

References

1973 births
Living people
Soviet footballers
Russian footballers
Association football midfielders
Association football defenders
Russia youth international footballers
FC Spartak Moscow players
FC Lokomotiv Nizhny Novgorod players
FC Baltika Kaliningrad players
Soviet Top League players
Russian Premier League players
Russian football managers
FC Znamya Truda Orekhovo-Zuyevo players